Tom Stock (born c. 1942) is retired American backstroke swimmer. During his career that spanned from about 1956 to 1964 he set several world and 14 national records. He missed the 1964 Olympics due to illness and was not selected for the 1960 Games because he finished third at the trials, whereas only two swimmers were chosen in that year. He was American Swimmer of the Year in 1962. 
In 1989 he was inducted to the International Swimming Hall of Fame. 

Stock lives in Hinsdale, Illinois, with his wife, Ann, and two children. Together with a fellow swimmer Gary Verhoeven he owns the BVD Steel Hauling Company.

See also
 List of members of the International Swimming Hall of Fame
 World record progression 100 metres backstroke
 World record progression 200 metres backstroke
 World record progression 4 × 100 metres medley relay

References

1940s births
Living people
American male backstroke swimmers
20th-century American people